Claudio Pani (born 11 March 1986, Cagliari, Italy) is an Italian football midfielder, who currently plays for Sliema Wanderers in the Maltese Premier League.

External links
 

1986 births
Living people
Sportspeople from Cagliari
Italian footballers
Serie A players
Serie B players
Serie C players
Serie D players
Cagliari Calcio players
Modena F.C. players
U.S. Pistoiese 1921 players
U.S. Triestina Calcio 1918 players
S.S.D. Lucchese 1905 players
Casale F.B.C. players
Piacenza Calcio 1919 players
Savona F.B.C. players
Valletta F.C. players
Sliema Wanderers F.C. players
Italy youth international footballers
Footballers from Sardinia
Maltese Premier League players
Expatriate footballers in Malta
Association football midfielders